Cleburne Independent School District is a public school district based in Cleburne, Texas.

In 2009, the school district was rated "academically acceptable" by the Texas Education Agency.

History

On July 1, 1988, Liberty Chapel Independent School District merged into Cleburne ISD.

Schools
 High school (Grades 9-12)
Cleburne High School
Cleburne has won three state championships. The most recent was in 1995 in 4A girls basketball, and twice before in football, both times being recognized as co-champions when the championship game ended in a tie.  The first title was in 1920 (with Houston Heights High School), which was also the first championship recognized by Dave Campbell's Texas Football.  The second was in 1959 at Class AAA, a co-championship with Breckenridge.
DeWayne Burns, a 1990 Cleburne High School graduate and former member of the school district board, was elected to the Texas House of Representatives in 2014.
 Middle schools (Grades 6-8)
Lowell Smith Jr. Middle School
A.D. Wheat Middle School
 Elementary schools
Grades K-5
Adams Elementary School
Cooke Elementary School
Gerard Elementary School
Marti Elementary School
Grades PK-5
Coleman Elementary School
Irving Elementary School
Santa Fe Elementary School
 Alternative High School Education
TEAM School

References

External links
Cleburne ISD

School districts in Johnson County, Texas
Cleburne, Texas